This is a list of Massachusetts amphibians. It includes all amphibians currently found in Massachusetts. It does not include species found only in captivity. One species is identified as indicated below:

Salamanders

Frogs and toads

References
Massachusetts Reptiles and Amphibians List J.E. Cardoza and P.G. Mirick
USGS Online Guide to the amphibians of North America. Northern Prairie Wildlife Research Center. 1997. Checklist of Amphibian Species and Identification Guide: An Online Guide for the Identification of Amphibians in North America north of Mexico. Jamestown, ND: Northern Prairie Wildlife Research Center Online.

Amphibians
Massachusetts
.Amphibians